Leena is a feminine given name. It is a variant spelling of Lina and Lena.

It is a direct Quranic Arabic name, meaning "young palm tree", or figuratively "tender, young, delicate".

In Persian, it means "light", "a ray of sunlight" or "beautiful girl". In Kurdish, it means cascade falls (تئاڤگەی بچوک).

Notable people with the name include:

 Leena (model) (born 1990), Japanese fashion model
 Leena Alam, Afghan film actress
 Leena Khamis (born 1986), Australian football player of Assyrian-Iraqi descent
 Leena Chandavarkar (born 1950), Indian Bollywood actress
 Leena Dhingra, British Asian actress
 Leena Gade (born c. 1975), British race engineer
 Leena Günther (born 1991), German sprint athlete
 Leena Harkimo (born 1963), Finnish politician and business executive
 Leena Häkinen (1928–1990), Finnish stage, film and television actress
 Leena Jumani, Indian actress and model
 Leena Kapoor (born 1994), Indian model and actress
 Leena Krohn (born 1947), Finnish author
 Leena La Bianca (born 1963), Italian American pornographic actress
 Leena Lander (born 1955), Finnish author
 Leena Lehtolainen (born 1964), Finnish crime novelist
 Leena Luhtanen (born 1941), Finnish politician, member of the cabinet
 Leena Luostarinen (1949–2013), Finnish painter
 Leena Manimekalai, Indian filmmaker, poet and actor
 Leena Mohanty, Indian Odissi dancer
 Leena Nair (born 1969), Indian businesswoman
 Leena Peisa (born 1979), Finnish keyboard player
 Leena Peltonen-Palotie (1952–2010), Finnish geneticist
 Leena Pietilä (1925–2014), Finnish figure skater
 Leena Puotiniemi (born 1976), Finnish long-distance runner
 Leena Puranen (born 1986), Finnish football forward
 Leena Rauhala (born 1942), Finnish politician, member of the Parliament of Finland
 Leena Salmenkylä (born 1958), Finnish orienteering competitor
 Leena Silvennoinen (born 1958), Finnish orienteering competitor
 Leena Tiwari, Indian politician, member of 17th Legislative Assembly of Mariyahu, Uttar Pradesh
 Leena Yadav (born 1971), Indian filmmaker and producer

Fictional characters
 Leena (Warehouse 13), from Warehouse 13
A character in Chrono Cross
Leena Klammer, the main antagonist from Orphan (2009 film) and it's sequel.

Media
 Leena (film), a Maldivian thriller film
 "Leena", a song by Caravan Palace on the 2019 album Chronologic

See also
 Lena (name)

Finnish feminine given names